825 Fifth Avenue is a luxury apartment building located on Fifth Avenue between East 63rd and East 64th Streets in the Lenox Hill neighborhood of Manhattan, New York City.  It was built by the Paterno Brothers.

Design
The 23-floor building was erected in 1926-1927 as a cooperative with 77 apartments, but today it has only 64 units. Developer Joseph Paterno initially opted to list the building as an apartment-hotel so as to legally build 23 stories as opposed to only 15 stories restricted for apartment houses. The building has a notable red-tiled steep-pitched roof, making it visible from a long distance. When it was built, The Real Estate Record & Guide praised the $1 million building's "unusually striking upper-floor effect."

References

External links

Apartment buildings in New York City
Residential buildings in Manhattan
Condominiums and housing cooperatives in Manhattan
Fifth Avenue
Upper East Side
Residential buildings completed in 1927
1927 establishments in New York City